The Providian Financial Building (also known as the Pacific Gateway Building) is a high-rise office building located at 201 Mission Street in the South of Market district of San Francisco, California. Its construction was completed in 1981.

The building is located on an unusual trapezoidal mid-block lot that extends from Mission Street to Howard Street. When it was constructed, the building was flanked by ramps to the Embarcadero Freeway, which have since been torn down.

See also

 List of tallest buildings in San Francisco

References

Skyscraper office buildings in San Francisco
South of Market, San Francisco

Office buildings completed in 1981
Leadership in Energy and Environmental Design basic silver certified buildings
1981 establishments in California